Salwa Zeidan is a Lebanese artist, sculptor, and curator.

Life
Zeidan was born in Bekaa Valley, Lebanon, Zeidan left Lebanon in the 1980s. Zeidan moved to the United Arab Emirates where she continued working as a painter. She curated exhibitions in different venues before she opened her Art Gallery in 1994. The Salwa Zeidan gallery is in Abu Dhabi.

References

Lebanese sculptors
Living people
Lebanese women sculptors
Lebanese women painters
Lebanese painters
Year of birth missing (living people)
Lebanese women artists